Vladimir Petrovich Skulachev ([skulɑ'tʃɔf]; usually ['skuːlɑtʃef] in English; ; 21 February 1935 – 5 February 2023) was a Russian biochemist, Academician of the Russian Academy of Sciences (since 1990), Doctor of Biological Sciences, Distinguished Professor at the Lomonosov Moscow State University, where he also was Dean of the Faculty of Bioengineering and Bioinformatics and Director of the A.N. Belozersky Institute Of Physico-Chemical Biology. Member of Academia Europaea.
Laureate of the 1975 USSR State Prize and of the 2017 Demidov Prize.
President of the Biochemical Society (Russia).

Skulachev graduated from the MSU Faculty of Biology in 1957.

Skulachev was elected a corresponding member of the Academy of Sciences of the USSR in 1974 and full member in 1990.

Skulachev was Editor-in-Chief of the Биохимия (Biochemistry), journal of the Russian Academy of Sciences. He was also a member of the Editorial Board for Journal Bioenergetics and Biomembranes.

Skulachev was awarded:
 Order of the Red Banner of Labour (1972)
 Order of Honour (Russia) (1996)
 Order of Friendship (2013)

References

External links
 
 

1935 births
2023 deaths
Russian biochemists
Soviet biochemists
Russian professors
Full Members of the USSR Academy of Sciences
Full Members of the Russian Academy of Sciences
Members of Academia Europaea
Recipients of the USSR State Prize
Recipients of the Lenin Komsomol Prize
Recipients of the Order of the Red Banner of Labour
Recipients of the Order "For Merit to the Fatherland", 4th class
Recipients of the Order of Honour (Russia)
Demidov Prize laureates
Academic staff of Moscow State University
Moscow State University alumni
Scientists from Moscow